The men's javelin throw was an event at the 1956 Summer Olympics in Melbourne, Australia. The qualifying stage and the final both were held on the third day of the track and field competition, on Monday November 26, 1956.

The 1956 Olympic Games are notable for being the only time that Finland did not take part in this event.

Final classification

References

External links
 Official Report
 Results

M
Javelin throw at the Olympics
Men's events at the 1956 Summer Olympics